Pennsylvania Route 513 (PA 513) is a   state highway in Bucks County, Pennsylvania. The route runs from U.S. Route 13 (US 13) in Bensalem Township north to PA 413 in Penndel. The route passes through suburban areas in lower Bucks County, serving Bensalem Township, Hulmeville, and Penndel. PA 513 has intermediate junctions with PA 132 in Bensalem Township and US 1 Business (US 1 Bus.) in Penndel. PA 513 was designated in 1928 between US 13 in Cornwells Heights and PA 101 near South Langhorne. By 1947, PA 513 was rerouted to its current northern terminus, replacing a part of PA 113.

Route description

PA 513 begins at an intersection with US 13 in the Cornwells Heights section of Bensalem Township, Bucks County, heading northeast on two-lane undivided Hulmeville Road. The route passes through suburban residential areas, running to the east of Bensalem Township Country Club. The road crosses PA 132 in a commercial area, where it becomes a three-lane road with a center left-turn lane. PA 513 heads through areas of homes and businesses, passing to the west of Bensalem High School. The road comes to a bridge over the Pennsylvania Turnpike (Interstate 276) and continues through suburban development as a two-lane road. The route crosses the Neshaminy Creek into the borough of Hulmeville, where it turns north onto Bellevue Avenue at the Trenton Road intersection and passes through wooded areas of homes. The road continues north into the borough of Penndel and runs past more homes and businesses, reaching an intersection with US 1 Bus. (Lincoln Highway). A short distance later, PA 513 comes to its northern terminus at an intersection with PA 413, at which point Bellevue Avenue continues north as PA 413.

History

By 1911, what is now PA 513 was a paved road between present-day US 13 and PA 132 while the remainder was unpaved. PA 513 was designated in 1928 to run from US 13 in Cornwells Heights north to PA 101 (Durham Road) near South Langhorne, following its present alignment to Hulmeville and continuing northeast on Trenton Road to PA 101. By this time, the entire route was paved. By 1947, PA 513 was realigned at Hulmeville to head north to US 1 (now US 1 Bus.) and PA 413 in Penndel, replacing a portion of PA 113.

Major intersections

See also

References

External links

Pennsylvania Highways: PA 513

513
Transportation in Bucks County, Pennsylvania